This Was the Time is a Canadian documentary film, directed by Eugene Boyko and released in 1970. Created for the National Film Board of Canada, the film portrays the renaissance of Haida culture through its depiction of a potlatch ceremony in Haida Gwaii, culminating in artist Robert Davidson carving and erecting a totem pole in the community for the first time in nearly a century.

In the 21st century, the NFB launched a project to counter the sometimes colonialist outsider perspectives reflected in many of its old documentaries on First Nations and Inuit cultures by commissioning indigenous filmmakers to make their own new films responding to and recontextualizing the older films. Christopher Auchter's Now Is the Time, a response to This Was the Time which mixed footage from the original film with contemporary footage including Davidson's own reflections on the project, was released in 2019.

References

External links

1970 films
Canadian short documentary films
Documentary films about First Nations
Films shot in British Columbia
National Film Board of Canada documentaries
National Film Board of Canada short films
1970s English-language films
Films set in British Columbia
English-language Canadian films
1970s Canadian films